Vale do Lobo is a golf resort in the Algarve region of southern Portugal. Vale do Lobo comprises one of the three corners of the Golden Triangle of the Algarve's most affluent and expensive communities. 

The community hosted the Portuguese Open, part of the PGA European Tour, in 2002 and 2003.

History

Vale do Lobo was among the first tourist resorts to be built in Portugal, having been catalysed by the Estado Novo's decision in 1962 to build Faro Airport following the success in the 1950s of luxury Spanish resorts such as Torremolinos. In 1962, Trust House Forte acquired the land which became Vale do Lobo with the intention of turning it into a luxury resort. At the time, the region was a stone pine forest with a sand beach. Townhouses and villas were built for tourists and permanent foreign residents. An 18-hole golf course designed by Henry Cotton was built and Vale do Lobo quickly become a popular destination with the British market. In 1968, Trust House Forte and Costain Group opened the first five-star hotel in the Algarve, the Dona Filipa, named after Philippa of Lancaster, whose marriage to John I of Portugal confirmed the 700-year-old Anglo-Portuguese Alliance.

In 1977 the, Venlo-born, Dutch entrepreneur Sander van Gelder acquired the resort out of receivership, after it had struggled financially following the 1974 Carnation Revolution. He had originally intended to acquire just a small plot of land in the area, but ended up taking the opportunity to acquire the whole resort. The resort was run under van Gelder's ownership for the next thirty years, adding another eighteen hole golf course and many facilities including bars, restaurants and shops. The resort hosted the Portuguese Open in 2002 and 2003.

In 2006 a combination of Portuguese and international investors together with the Portuguese state-owned bank Caixa Geral de Depósitos acquired the development from van Gelder, installing Diogo Gaspar Ferreira as CEO. Over the next four years, the consortium took out twelve loans to further develop the resort, for a total new debt of 249 million euros. By the summer of 2015 all of these loans were in arrearage.  Because five of these loans were from Caixa, at a time when Armando Vara was the bank's administrator, they were investigated as part of Operation Marquis, and figured in the charges against José Sócrates and other Operation Marquis defendants.

Golf Courses

Royal Course

Ocean Course

See also
 List of golf courses in Portugal

References

External links
Vale do Lobo – official site
 – Where to stay
 Faro Airport Transfers to Vale do Lobo

Golf clubs and courses in Portugal
Buildings and structures in the Algarve